The Type 63 is a Chinese-designed assault rifle with a resemblance to the SKS. The weapon features a fully-automatic rotating-bolt system modified from the Type 56 assault rifle instead of the tilting bolt system of the SKS. Overall, the weapon is based on the Type 56 carbine (Chinese SKS) and the Type 56 assault rifle which are both used by the People's Liberation Army.

Development
The Type 63 was intended to replace the Type 56 semi-automatic carbine in Chinese service at one time when infantry felt the need for a compromise between rifle firepower and long rifle range and to help the Type 56 rifle integrate into service as there were too few of these to equip the entire PLA. The development of the Type 63 started in 1959; the design certificate was issued in 1963 (which is why the Chinese designation is "Type 63"), and the rifle entered service within the PLA in 1968.

Other than China, the biggest user of the Type 63 rifle was Albania, where it was exported in quantities when the Communist regime split from the Soviet sphere of influence. The Type 63 rifle was also exported by China to North Vietnam during the Vietnam War, and throughout the 1970s, it was also sent in smaller amounts to Burma, Cambodia and other countries in Asia and Africa. Shipments were also made to Afghanistan to support the local guerrilla fighters against the Soviet invasion.

North Korea also has used the Type 63 rifle in addition to their own locally produced SKS rifles.

Design
The Type 63 rifle is a select-fire weapon, fed by proprietary "cut-down" 20-round magazines or standard AK-47 30-round magazines, although these require minor modifications (removal of the bolt hold-open device) to fit. The fire selector is placed on the right side of the weapon right above the trigger guard, at index finger reach. The Type 63 rifle also features a non-removable folding spike-bayonet and a gas regulator system to use standard live ammunition or blank ammunition for the launch of rifle grenades.

The Type 63 was designed for semi-automatic fire with selective full-auto capability. The rifle was required by the People's Liberation Army to have higher accuracy compared to the Type 56 assault rifle. Moreover, the manufacturing process needs to be simplified to realize the military philosophy based on the use of masses in wartime. The weapon should facilitate the troops to be able to stop the enemy advance by rifle shots at extremely long distances as well as the use of the automatic fire for the final close-quarters engagements.

The initial production of the rifle showed a promising result. Comparing to the Type 56 assault rifle, which is an AK-47 clone, the Type 63 has higher reliability and better accuracy. It is fitted with the bolt hold-open device that both the AK-47 and Type 56 lacks. The service life of the Type 63 is 15,000 rounds due to efficient structural design and a streamlined manufacturing process, making it significantly better than the 6,000 rounds of Type 56 and AK-47 at the time.

Production
Although the initial production of Type 63 received positive feedback from the troops, the final production of Type 63 encountered enormous disruption due to the Cultural Revolution. The quality control of the production was severely affected, and the initial design was not respected. After the first batch of Type 63 finished production in 1969, subsequent batches received design changes that yielded questionable results. The service life degraded to 10,000 rounds instead of the promised 15,000 rounds. By the time it was finished, the weapon design was outdated as more compact, short-barreled assault rifles were taking the spotlight in modern warfare as shown in the US engagement in Vietnam.

Users

 : Used by the Mujahideen.
 
 
 : As of 2020, the Type 63 is mainly used in ceremonial events or with military honor guards.
 : People's Movement for the Liberation of Azawad
 : The Korean People's Army (KPA) has used the Type 63 rifle in service due to support from the People's Republic of China, but now mainly uses it as a ceremonial weapon or in military parades. The Worker Peasant Red Guards however are known to use the Type 63 as they are a paramilitary organization who uses older weapons that were once used in the KPA. The DPRK also produces their own version of the SKS which also is called the Type 63 and has the North Korean star on the receiver however it bears more resemblance to the regular SKS in some areas of their produced Type 63 rifles. 
 : In Vietnamese service the rifle is designated K63. It saw very little service in North Vietnam, and was withdrawn from front-line service after the Vietnam War ended. It is still in use by the Militia and Self-Defense (Vietnam).

References

Cold War weapons of China
Rifles of the Cold War
7.62×39mm assault rifles
Assault rifles of the People's Republic of China